Abdul Karim Misaq was a writer, politician and former Minister of Finance of Afghanistan.

Abdul Karim Misaq, born in 1935 in Ghazni province, Afghanistan, was from an ethnic Hazara family and after graduating in 1965, he became a member of the People's Democratic Party of Afghanistan. He later became a member of the party's bureau and served as Afghanistan's finance minister during the reigns of Nur Muhammad Taraki and Hafizullah Amin from 1978 to 1979.
Abdul Karim Misaq was the mayor of Kabul for one year in 1989, then took refuge in London in 1990.
He has authored about 20 books in the fields of fiction, poetry, history and politics.

Abdul Karim Misaq died on Saturday, April 16, 2016 in London at the age of eighty due to Parkinson's disease.

References

1935 births
2016 deaths
Hazara politicians
Afghan politicians